Tanui is a surname of Kenyan origin that may refer to:

Elisha Tanui (born 1983), Kenyan ultrarunner
Moses Tanui (born 1965), Kenyan long-distance runner and 1991 world champion
Paul Tanui  (born 1990), Kenyan long-distance runner and 2011 World Cross Country runner-up
William Tanui (born 1964), Kenyan middle-distance runner and 1992 Olympic champion
William Biwott Tanui(born 1990), Kenyan runner competing as İlham Tanui Özbilen

See also
Tanui, name meaning "son of Kiptanui"

Kalenjin names